The 2002 Men's Hockey RaboTrophy was the first edition of the men's field hockey tournament. The RaboTrophy was held in Amsterdam from 22 to 25 August 2002, and featured four of the top nations in men's field hockey.

The Netherlands won the tournament for the first time, finishing top of the ladder at the conclusion of the pool stage.

Competition format
The four teams competed in a pool stage, played in a single round robin format. Standings at the conclusion of the pool stage determined final placings.

Teams
The following four teams competed for the title:

Officials
The following umpires were appointed by the International Hockey Federation to officiate the tournament:

 Christian Bläsch (GER)
 David Gentles (AUS)
 Han Jin-Soo (KOR)
 Satinder Kumar (IND)
 Philip Schellekens (NED)

Results
All times are local (Central European Time).

Pool

Fixtures

Awards
The following awards were presented at the conclusion of the tournament:

Statistics

Final standings

Goalscorers

References

External links
Official website

RaboTrophy
Hockey RaboTrophy
Men's Hockey RaboTrophy
Hockey RaboTrophy
Sports competitions in Amstelveen